Olivier Pfister is a US physicist, professor of Experimental Atomic, Molecular, and Optical Physics at the University of Virginia. He obtained his doctorate in physics in 1993 at Paris 13 University.
Olivier Pfister also specializes in the fields of Quantum Fields and Quantum Information.

References

Further reading
List of papers on Google Scholar

Year of birth missing (living people)
Living people
20th-century American physicists
University of Virginia faculty
University of Paris alumni